Kısmetli is a village in the Dargeçit District of Mardin Province in Turkey. The village is populated by Kurds of the Basiqil tribe and had a population of 137 in 2021.

References 

Villages in Dargeçit District
Kurdish settlements in Mardin Province